The August Derleth Award is one of the British Fantasy Awards bestowed annually by the British Fantasy Society.  The award is named after the American writer and editor August Derleth. It was inaugurated in 1972 for the best novel of the year, was not awarded in 2011, and was resumed in 2012 for the best horror novel of the year.

Winners
The August Derleth Award was conferred 45 times in 46 years to 2017, including 39 times to 2010 for the best novel of the year. Its multiple winners include Ramsey Campbell (6), Graham Joyce (5), Michael Moorcock and Stephen King (4).
 
Source: August Derleth Award, Worlds Without End (worldswithoutend.com)

Best novel of the year (1972–2010)

 1972 The Knight of the Swords, Michael Moorcock
 1973 The King of the Swords, Michael Moorcock
 1974 Hrolf Kraki's Saga, Poul Anderson
 1975 The Sword and the Stallion, Michael Moorcock
 1976 The Hollow Lands, Michael Moorcock
 1977 The Dragon and the George, Gordon R. Dickson
 1978 A Spell for Chameleon, Piers Anthony
 1979 The Chronicles of Thomas Covenant, the Unbeliever, Stephen R. Donaldson
 1980 Death's Master, Tanith Lee
 1981 To Wake the Dead, Ramsey Campbell
 1982 Cujo, Stephen King
 1983 The Sword of the Lictor, Gene Wolfe
 1984 Floating Dragon, Peter Straub
 1985 Incarnate, Ramsey Campbell
 1986 The Ceremonies, T. E. D. Klein
 1987 It, Stephen King
 1988 The Hungry Moon, Ramsey Campbell
 1989 The Influence, Ramsey Campbell
 1990 Carrion Comfort, Dan Simmons
 1991 Midnight Sun, Ramsey Campbell
 1992 Outside the Dog Museum, Jonathan Carroll
 1993 Dark Sister, Graham Joyce
 1994 The Long Lost, Ramsey Campbell
 1995 Only Forward, Michael Marshall Smith
 1996 Requiem, Graham Joyce
 1997 The Tooth Fairy, Graham Joyce
 1998 Light Errant, Chaz Brenchley
 1999 Bag of Bones, Stephen King
 2000 Indigo, Graham Joyce
 2001 Perdido Street Station, China Miéville
 2002 The Night of the Triffids, Simon Clark
 2003 The Scar, China Miéville
 2004 Full Dark House, Christopher Fowler
 2005 Dark Tower VII: The Dark Tower, Stephen King
 2006 Anansi Boys, Neil Gaiman
 2007 Dusk, Tim Lebbon
 2008 The Grin of the Dark, Ramsey Campbell
 2009 Memoirs of a Master Forger, William Heaney (Graham Joyce)
 2010 One, Conrad Williams

Best horror novel (2012–present)

 2012 The Ritual, Adam Nevill
 2013 Last Days, Adam Nevill
 2014 The Shining Girls, Lauren Beukes
 2015 No One Gets Out Alive, Adam Nevill
 2016 Rawblood, Catriona Ward
 2017 Disappearance at Devil's Rock, Paul G. Tremblay
 2018 The Changeling, Victor LaValle
 2019 Little Eve, Catriona Ward
 2020 The Reddening, Adam Nevill 
 2021 Mexican Gothic, by Silvia Moreno-Garcia

References

English literary awards
British speculative fiction awards
Awards established in 1972
1972 establishments in the United Kingdom